Anshe may refer to:

Synagogues and Jewish organizations
Anshe Sfard, a synagogue in New Orleans, Louisiana
Anshe Sholom B'nai Israel, a Modern Orthodox congregation in Chicago, Illinois
Bernard Zell Anshe Emet Day School (BZAEDS), a Jewish school in Chicago, Illinois
Temple Anshe Amunim (Pittsfield, Massachusetts), a Jewish congregation in Pittsfield, Massachusetts
Temple Anshe Hesed, a Reform synagogue in Erie, Pennsylvania

Other uses
Anshe Chung, a character in the online world Second Life